The 1959–60 Western Kentucky State Hilltoppers men's basketball team represented Western Kentucky State College (now known as Western Kentucky University) during the 1959-60 NCAA University Division Basketball season. The Hilltoppers were led by future Naismith Memorial Basketball Hall of Fame coach Edgar Diddle.  The Hilltoppers won the Ohio Valley Conference championship, as well as the conference's automatic bid to the 1960 NCAA University Division basketball tournament, where they advanced to the Sweet Sixteen.    
This team was very balanced, with four players being named to the All-Conference Team: Charlie Osborne, Bobby Rascoe, Al Ellison, and Don Parsons.

Schedule

|-
!colspan=6| Regular Season

|-

|-
!colspan=6| 1960 NCAA University Division basketball tournament

References

Western Kentucky Hilltoppers basketball seasons
Western Kentucky State
Western Kentucky State
Western Kentucky State Basketball, Men's
Western Kentucky State Basketball, Men's